Luke 6 is the sixth chapter of the Gospel of Luke in the New Testament of the Christian Bible, traditionally attributed to Luke the Evangelist, a companion of Paul the Apostle on his missionary journeys. Jesus' teaching about the Sabbath enrages the religious authorities and deepens their conflict. The selection of twelve apostles is recounted and this is followed by the "Sermon on the Plain", where key aspects of Jesus' teaching are presented.

Text 
The original text was written in Koine Greek. This chapter is divided into 49 verses.

Textual witnesses
Some early manuscripts containing the text of this chapter are:
Papyrus 4 (AD 150-175; extant verses: 1-16)
Papyrus 75 (175-225)
Codex Vaticanus (325-350)
Codex Sinaiticus (330-360)
Codex Bezae (~400)
Codex Washingtonianus (~400)
Codex Alexandrinus (400-440)
Codex Ephraemi Rescriptus (~450)

The Sabbath conflict (6:1-11)
Luke relates two events which show the differences in the teaching about the Sabbath and lead to a widening conflict between Jesus and the religious authorities.

Lord of the Sabbath

This story is told in the synoptic gospels. Jesus' disciples are accused of breaking the Law by the Jewish authorities who see them pluck wheat, rub it and eat it during the Sabbath. Jesus invites his audience to recall the actions of David and his men who when hungry received the showbread. Jesus indicates that he - the Son of Man - is the Lord of the Sabbath. Mark's text on the purpose of the Sabbath, The Sabbath was made for man, and not man for the Sabbath, is not repeated in Luke.

Luke places the event at a specific date:  (en sabbatō deuteroprōtō), translated in the King James Version as "on the second Sabbath after the first". This phrase is not found elsewhere in the Gospel, and it is omitted in some ancient manuscripts, the New International Version and some other modern versions. Evangelical writer Jeremy Myers suggests this could have been the day of Shavuot (Festival of Weeks), which would give the action of Jesus an added significance. Only the priests were allowed to collect wheat and process it on the Sabbath to bake the showbread (which they could eat). Jesus extends this privilege to his disciples: in essence, in his teaching, priesthood is open to all. This action represents a radical departure from traditional ways and structures, and undermines the special status of the priests.

The healing on the Sabbath

The story is told in the synoptic gospels. In a synagogue, Jesus calls forward a man with a withered hand on a Sabbath. The synagogue was possibly the one in Capernaum, but many commentators argue that "it is impossible to say where the synagogue was to which [the] Pharisees belonged". Healing him by the verbal command: "Stretch forth thy hand", Jesus challenges the priestly authorities. They do not argue with him directly, but are "filled with anger" (verse 11 in the New Life Version, NLV). On the Sabbath they begin to plot against Jesus, ignoring his question: "I will ask you one thing. Does the Law say to do good on the Day of Rest or to do bad? To save life or to kill?" (NLV).

The choosing of the twelve apostles (6:12-16)

After retreating in prayer on a mountain, Jesus chooses twelve apostles, according to Luke: "Simon (whom he named Peter), his brother Andrew, James, John, Philip, Bartholomew, Matthew, Thomas, James son of Alphaeus, Simon who was called the Zealot, Judas son of James, and Judas Iscariot, who became a traitor".
 

The Sermon on the Plain (6:17-49)
 
The commissioning of the apostles is followed by a description of the multitude gathered from all Judea and Jerusalem, and from the seacoast of Tyre and Sidon, and then by a sermon that lays down key aspects of Jesus' teachings. In the parallel section of Matthew's gospel, the crowds are said to have come from Galilee, and from the Decapolis, Jerusalem, Judea, and beyond the Jordan. Mark's description is the most extensive of the three synoptic gospels: "a great multitude from Galilee followed Him, and from Judea and Jerusalem and Idumea and beyond the Jordan; and those from Tyre and Sidon". The Cambridge Bible for Schools and Colleges concludes "thus there were Jews, Greeks, Phoenicians, and Arabs among our Lord’s hearers".

The four beatitudes and the four woes (6:20–26)
The sermon starts with a set of teachings about the four beatitudes and the four woes. The sermon may be compared with the more extensive Sermon on the Mount as recounted by the Gospel of Matthew. Both seem to occur shortly after the commissioning of the twelve apostles featuring Jesus on a mountain. In Luke, he delivers the sermon below the mountain at a level spot: Lutheran theologian Johann Bengel suggests perhaps half-way down the mountain: "a more suitable locality for addressing a large audience than a completely level plain". Some scholars believe that the Sermon on the Mount and the Sermon on the Plain are the same sermon, while others hold that Jesus frequently preached similar themes in different places. Luke will later relate the six woes of the Pharisees.

Verse 20
And he [Jesus Christ] lifted up his eyes on his disciples, and said, 
 [1] Blessed be ye poor: for yours is the kingdom of God.

Verse 21
 [2] Blessed are ye that hunger now: for ye shall be filled.
 [3] Blessed are ye that weep now: for ye shall laugh.

Verse 22
 [4] Blessed are ye, when men shall hate you, and when they shall separate you from their company, and shall reproach you, and cast out your name as evil, for the Son of man's sake.

Love thy enemies (6:27–36)

As a key teaching of Jesus, this saying follows immediately after the four beatitudes and woes. Jesus expands on the theme indicating that loving people who love you is nothing special, instead he challenges his listeners to love those who hate them, and asks his followers to be merciful like the Father. The section also contains what is considered the Golden Rule.

Verse 35
But love your enemies, and do good, and lend, expecting nothing in return, and your reward will be great, and you will be sons of the Most High, for he is kind to the ungrateful and the evil.
"The ungrateful and the evil": or "the unthankful" and "the immoral".

Judging others

Jesus delivers a warning not to judge others.

The blind leading the blind

This metaphor issues a warning that teaching needs to be done by leaders who are properly trained.

A speck of sawdust

Jesus rebukes those who see faults in others and fail to examine themselves. Matthew relates the teaching as well.

The tree and its fruit

Jesus offers a parable about testing a person.

The wise and foolish builders (6:46–49)

This represents a teaching about placing one's life on the solid foundation provided by Jesus.

Uses
The coffee and cocoa cups's bottom of In-N-Out Burger has the text "LUKE 6:35", which refers to the 35th verse of this chapter.

See also
The Mote in God's Eye, a novel as a wordplay on 6:41–42 and Matthew 7:3–5
Turning the other cheek

References

External links 
 King James Bible - Wikisource
English Translation with Parallel Latin Vulgate
Online Bible at GospelHall.org (ESV, KJV, Darby, American Standard Version, Bible in Basic English)
Multiple bible versions at Bible Gateway (NKJV, NIV, NRSV etc.)

 
Luke 06
Phoenicians in the New Testament